Lampronia standfussiella is a moth of the family Prodoxidae. It is found in central Europe, including the Alps, Germany, Austria and Poland, north to Finland and Sweden and northern Russia.

The larvae probably feed on Rosa species. Larvae have been reported on Rosa majalis and Ribes spicatum.

External links
 Fauna Europaea
 Species info
 Swedish Moths

Prodoxidae
Moths described in 1839
Moths of Europe